The INAS 300 is the longest serving combat unit of the Indian Navy, based at INS Hansa.

History 
The White Tigers were commissioned on 7 July 1959 at RNAS Brawdy, United Kingdom with the Indian High Commissioner to UK, Vijay Laxmi Pandit, in attendance. The first Squadron Commander was Lt Cdr B D Law. The squadron was initially equipped with the Hawker Sea Hawk aircraft. During the course of the next ten years the Indian Navy inducted fifty-four Sea Hawks in a phased manner, the last aircraft being delivered in December 1971.
The Sea Hawks were retired from the Indian Navy in a phased manner in the late-70s and early-80s.
The Sea Harriers were replaced by MiG-29KUBs on 11 May 2016 in a ceremony held at INS Hansa.
They now act as an operational conversion unit for the INAS 303, the black panthers.

References 

Aircraft squadrons of the Indian Navy
Naval units and formations of India